In the United States Army, U.S. Marine Corps (USMC), U.S. Air Force (USAF), and U.S. Space Force (USSF), captain (abbreviated "CPT" in the  and "Capt" in the USMC, USAF, and USSF) is a company-grade officer rank, with the pay grade of O-3. It ranks above first lieutenant and below major. It is equivalent to the rank of lieutenant in the Navy/Coast Guard officer rank system and is different from the higher Navy/Coast Guard rank of captain. The insignia for the rank consists of two silver bars, with slight stylized differences between the Army/Air Force version and the Marine Corps version.

History

The U.S. military inherited the rank of captain from its British Army forebears. In the British Army, the captain was designated as the appropriate rank for the commanding officer of infantry companies, artillery batteries, and cavalry troops, which were considered as equivalent-level units. Captains also served as staff officers in regimental and brigade headquarters and as aides-de-camp to brigadiers and general officers. British Marine battalions also utilized captain as the appropriate rank of their constituent Marine companies. Therefore, American colonial militia and Provincial Regular units (e.g., First and Second Virginia Regiments), as well as colonial Marines, mirrored British Army and Marine organization and rank structure.

On July 23, 1775, General Washington decreed that captains would wear a "yellow or buff" cockade in their hats as their badge of rank. In 1779, the rank insignia for captains was changed to an epaulette worn of the right shoulder. Infantry captains wore a silver epaulette while all other captains wore a gold epaulette. Both company-grade officers and non-commissioned officers began wearing chevrons as rank insignia in 1821. The captain wore a single chevron, point up, above the elbow on each sleeve; again, the color was silver for infantry captains and gold for all other captains. In 1832, company-grade officers ceased wearing chevrons and reverted to a system of epaulettes (again silver for infantry and gold for all others); captains wearing an epaulette on each shoulder, but smaller and less elaborate than the field grade officer versions. In 1836, captains began wearing an insignia of two bars (gold for infantry and silver for all others). Finally, in 1872, all captains, regardless of branch, began to wear two silver bars.

Description

Company commanders
An Army captain generally serves as a battalion/squadron (cavalry) or brigade staff officer and may have an opportunity to command a company/battery (field and air defense artillery)/troop (cavalry). When given such a command, they bear the title company/battery/troop commander. U.S. Army Special Forces (12-member) Operational Detachments Alpha are also commanded by a captain, who has the title of "detachment commander."

Marine captains generally serve as staff officers in battalions/squadrons (aviation), regiments/aviation groups (MAG or MACG), or in MAGTFs (MEU and MEB) and may have an opportunity to command companies, batteries (artillery and air defense) or various types of detachments, with the title of commanding officer. In the Marine Raider Regiment, a captain, with the title of "team leader," commands a 14-man Marine Special Operations Team (MSOT). Marine captains also serve as executive officers (i.e., second-in-command) of infantry battalion weapons companies and some other larger combat logistics and aviation support units. Marine Aviation captains routinely serve as aircraft and air mission commanders, aircraft section and division leaders, aviation maintenance department division officers, and as officers-in-charge (OIC) of various combat logistics and aviation support functional and staff sections.

An Air Force captain's authority varies by group assignment. In an operations group, senior captains may be flight commanders while more junior captains may be heads of departments. In the maintenance or logistics and mission support groups they are almost always flight commanders. In the medical group, captains usually have limited administrative and command responsibility as captain is frequently the entry-level rank for most medical officers and dental officers.

In the Space Force, a captain typically has authority over a flight, and is referred to as a company commander.

Staff officers
Captains of all four services routinely serve as instructors at service schools and combat training centers, aide-de-camps to general officers, liaison and exchange officers to other units, services, and foreign militaries, recruiting officers, students in advanced and graduate/post-graduate programs in Professional Military Education institutions and civilian universities, and on various types of special assignments.

Specialty branches
In Army and Air Force medical units, captain is the entry-level rank for those possessing a medical degree, or a doctorate in a healthcare profession. Other health care professions including nurse anesthetists, pharmacists, optometrists, veterinarians, and physician assistants, among others may start as first lieutenants promotable upon completion of initial entry training.

In Army and Air Force Judge Advocate General Corps, lawyers with a Juris Doctor degree and membership in the bar of at least one U.S. state or territory are appointed captains, or first lieutenants promotable upon completion of initial entry training. 

However, in Marine Corps Judge Advocates, after earning their commissions as unrestricted line officer second lieutenants, as well as earning an accredited law degree and passing a bar examination, enter active duty as first lieutenants and must complete the Marine Officer Basic Officer Course/The Basic School to qualify as rifle platoon commanders, before subsequently attending their MOS school prior to assignment to their first Marine Corps Judge Advocate billet and completing the minimum time in grade requirements for selection for and promotion to captain.

Insignia

See also 

 Police captain
 United States Army officer rank insignia
 United States Air Force officer rank insignia

References

Further reading
DA Pamphlet 600–3, Commissioned Officer Professional Development and Career Management

Military ranks of the United States Army
Military ranks of the United States Marine Corps
Officer ranks of the United States Air Force
Officer ranks of the United States Space Force